Lumb is a small village in the Rossendale district of Lancashire, England. It should not be confused with the hamlet of Lumb near Edenfield, also in the Rossendale district.

Lumb was historically in the large ancient parish of Whalley.  In 1846 it was constituted a chapelry within the parish of Whalley, which also included the village of Water.  In 1866 it became part of the civil parish of Newchurch, and in 1894 was transferred to the municipal borough and civil parish of Rawtenstall.

St Michael's parish church was founded in 1846.

See also

Listed buildings in Rawtenstall

References 

Villages in Lancashire
Geography of the Borough of Rossendale